Raad is a surname and a masculine given name. People with the surname include:

Surname
Haidar Raad (born 1991), Iraqi football player
Ignace Raad (1923–1999), Lebanese Archbishop of the Melkite Greek Catholic
Iqbal Raad (died 2000), Pakistani lawyer
Joe Raad (born 1985), Lebanese musical artist
Khalid Raad, Syrian economist and politician
Khalil Raad (1854–1957), Palestinian photographer
Mohammad Raad (born 1955), Lebanese politician
Ouday Raad (born 1966), Lebanese actor 
Tammam Raad (born 1965), Syrian politician
Trude Raad (born 1990), Norwegian track and field athlete
Walid Raad (born 1967), Lebanese media artist

Given name
Raad Ghantous, Iraqi interior designer
Raad Hammoudi (born 1958), Iraqi football player
Raad Mohiaddin (born c. 1957), British physician 
Raad Salam Naaman (born 1959), Iraqi-born Spanish author, academic and politician
Raad Mutar Saleh (died 2006), leader of the Mandaean community in Iraq
Raad Shakir (born 1948), Iraqi British physician and academic
Ra'ad bin Zeid (born 1936), member of the Jordanian royal family Hashemites

See also
 Raad (disambiguation)

Arabic-language surnames
Arabic masculine given names